Virginia Commonwealth University School of Dentistry is the dental school of Virginia Commonwealth University. Located in the United States city of Richmond. The school opened in 1893. It is the only dental school in Virginia and is one of five schools within the VCU Medical Center.

History 
Virginia Commonwealth University School of Dentistry is a part of Virginia Commonwealth University. The school was established in 1893.

Departments 
Department of Endodontics
Department of General Practice
Department of Oral Health Promotion and Community Outreach
Department of Oral and Maxillofacial Surgery
Department of Oral Diagnostic Sciences
Department of Orthodontics
Department of Pediatric Dentistry
Department of Periodontics
Department of Prosthodontics
Philips Institute for Oral Health Research

Accreditation 
Virginia Commonwealth University School of Dentistry is currently accredited by ADA.

Notable faculty 
John A. DiBiaggio, dean 1970–1976, later president of the University of Connecticut, Michigan State University and Tufts University
Daniel M. Laskin, oral and maxillofacial surgeon and educator

See also

American Student Dental Association

References 

Dental schools in Virginia
Education in Richmond, Virginia
Educational institutions established in 1893
Dentistry
1893 establishments in Virginia